Richard Roy (born 10 October 1987) is a Trinidadian international footballer who plays for Scottish club Downfield, as a striker.

He has previously played for Defence Force in his homeland, and Scottish clubs Hamilton Academical and Broughty Athletic.

Club career
Born in Morvant, Roy has played club football in Trinidad and Tobago for Defence Force. He was top scorer of the TT Pro League in the 2011–12 season, scoring 14 goals.

On 5 August 2016, Roy signed for Scottish Premiership club Hamilton Academical on a four-month contract. In December 2016 it was announced that he would leave the club later that month. He officially left at the start of January 2017.

On 27 January 2017, Roy signed for Junior club Broughty Athletic.

On 9 November 2017, Roy signed for I-League club NEROCA.

Roy returned to Scotland to play for Midlands League side Downfield for the 2021–22 season.

International career
He made his international debut for Trinidad and Tobago in 2008.

References

External links

1987 births
Living people
Trinidad and Tobago footballers
Trinidad and Tobago international footballers
Defence Force F.C. players
Hamilton Academical F.C. players
Broughty Athletic F.C. players
NEROCA FC players
TT Pro League players
Scottish Professional Football League players
Association football forwards
Trinidad and Tobago expatriate footballers
Trinidad and Tobago expatriate sportspeople in Scotland
Expatriate footballers in Scotland
Trinidad and Tobago expatriate sportspeople in India
Expatriate footballers in India
Downfield F.C. players